The Regeneron International Science and Engineering Fair (ISEF) is an annual science fair in the United States. It is owned and administered by the Society for Science, a 501(c)(3) non-profit organization based in Washington, D.C. Each May, more than 1500 students from roughly 70 countries and territories compete in the fair for scholarships, tuition grants, internships, scientific field trips and the grand prizes, including one $75,000 and two $50,000 college scholarships. All prizes together amount to over $5,000,000. Two awards ceremonies are held including: Special Awards Organization Presentation (which now includes the Government Awards Presentations) and the Grand Awards Ceremony. The International Science and Engineering Fair was founded in 1950 by Science Service (now the Society for Science) and was sponsored by Intel from 1997 to 2019. Since 2020, Regeneron Pharmaceuticals is the title sponsor for ISEF, but the event that year was cancelled and replaced with an online version due to the COVID-19 pandemic.

Notable alumni 
ISEF alumni include:

 Richard Zare (1957): American chemist who won the National Medal of Science in 1983 
 James Gunn (1957): Astronomer and MacArthur Fellow who won the National Medal of Science in 2008  
 John Clauser (1959 & 1960): American theoretical and experimental physicist who won the Nobel Prize in Physics in 2022
 Paul Modrich (1964): American biochemist who won the Nobel Prize in Chemistry in 2015 
 Susan Solomon (1972):  Atmospheric chemist who won the National Medal of Science in 1999  
 Kristina M. Johnson (1975): SUNY Chancellor 
 Dianne Newman (1987): Microbiologist 
 Vamsi Mootha (1989):  Mitochondrial biologist 2004 MacArthur Fellow
 Feng Zhang (2000): CRISPR researcher 
 Alexandria Ocasio-Cortez (2007): United States Congresswoman 
 Alex Deans (2013): Inventor

Contestants and competition 

Contestants are selected from regional, district, and state ISEF affiliated fairs. These fairs usually encompass multiple states or entire regions of a country. The regional fair committee is responsible for managing the fair when their city hosts the event.

Individual science projects and team science projects both compete for prizes. Teams are composed of two to as many as four high school students (grades 9-12).

The structure of the competition is as follows:
 Sunday: Arrival, project setup, fixing Display and Safety violations, and pin exchange
 Monday: Continual arrival and setup, opening ceremony
 Tuesday: Final project clearance
 Wednesday: Awards judging over 3 sessions, with both scheduled and unscheduled interviews
 Thursday: Public visitation day, special awards ceremony
 Friday: Grand awards ceremony, project teardown

Additionally, time is set aside for students to experience the host city, with ISEF coordinating signups for various tours and activities. A significant component of the program is social, as students interact with each other during mixers and ceremonies. Throughout much of the week, various seminars are also held for students, mentors, and teachers.

Projects and judging are divided into 21 subject categories as follows:
 Animal Sciences
 Behavioral and Social Sciences
 Biochemistry
 Biomedical and Health Sciences
 Biomedical Engineering
 Cellular and Molecular Biology
 Chemistry
 Computational Biology and Bioinformatics
 Earth and Environmental Sciences
 Embedded Systems
 Energy: Sustainable Materials and Design
 Engineering Technology: Statics and Dynamics
 Environmental Engineering
 Materials Science
 Mathematics
 Microbiology
 Physics and Astronomy
 Plant Sciences
 Robotics and Intelligent Machines
 Systems Software
 Translational Medical Science

Prizes and honors 
 George Yancopoulos Innovator Award: $75,000 scholarship, given to the top of the Best of Category Award winners, selected on the basis of innovative research and potential of the project to have an impact in the particular field and the world as a whole.
 Regeneron Young Scientist Award: $50,000 award presented by Regeneron and SSP to two Best in Category projects. Previous winners include Henry Lin and Eesha Khare.
 The Gordon E. Moore Award for Positive Outcomes for Future Generations: In recognition of Gordon E. Moore’s continued legacy of honoring the best at the International Science and Engineering Fair, the Gordon and Betty Moore Foundation is providing the $50,000 for the award.
 Dudley R. Herschbach SIYSS Award: all expense trip paid trip to the Stockholm International Youth Science Seminar, and attendance to the Nobel Prize ceremonies.
 Craig R. Barrett Award for Innovation: A $10,000 award given to the finalist who best demonstrates an innovation in Science, Technology, Engineering and Math, recognizing that research and innovation are dependent on the integration of these disciplines, as well as the impact they collectively have on our everyday lives
 H. Robert Horvitz Prize for Fundamental Research: $10,000 is given to the project that represents the best in fundamental research that furthers our understanding of science and/or mathematics and promotes the understanding of natural phenomena without clearly defined applications towards processes or products in mind.
 Peggy Scripps Award for Science Communication: A $10,000 award honoring Peggy Scripps who was a science journalist who served as a writer and editor of Science Newsletter for many years. This award is given to the finalist who is best able to communicate their project to the lay public, explaining both the science and its potential impact on society.
 Intel International Excellence in Teaching Award is also given during the Intel ISEF since 1997. A prominent awardee was Josette Biyo.

ISEF also used to hold a "People's Choice Award" to allow the public to vote for its favorite entries.

Since 2001, MIT's Lincoln Laboratory has named asteroids after ISEF winners as part of the Ceres Connection.

Multiple organizations sponsor 'special awards' with their own distinct criteria. These organizations include the National Security Agency, Association for Computing Machinery, IEEE Foundation, and Patent and Trademark Office Society.

Finalist Medal

The Regeneron ISEF Finalist Medal is given to about 1800 students from 75 countries each year, which are participating at the Regeneron International Science and Engineering Fair, which is owned and administered by the Society for Science, a 501(c)(3) non-profit organization based in Washington, DC.

Each year about 7 million students participate in different regional, district, and state ISEF affiliated fairs. Some of the winners of these affiliated fairs, which exist in over 75 countries, get the chance to take part at the Regeneron ISEF as a finalist, and each of them is awarded Regeneron ISEF Finalist Medal. In 2013 there were 1611 finalists at the Intel ISEF in Phoenix, Arizona.

The medal has a diameter of 48 mm and is golden galvanized. The obverse shows the official logo of the Regeneron ISEF, the reverse shows the year of participation and the location of that year's Regeneron ISEF.

The ribbon bar is blue with a width of 40 mm and has a golden romanic 1 in the middle.

Top prize winners 

When Intel began sponsoring ISEF in 1997, the Grand Awards were replaced with the Intel Foundation Young Scientist Awards, awarded to the top three projects. In 2010, the top award was renamed for Intel co-founder Gordon E. Moore.

ISEF 1997 (Louisville, Kentucky) 
 Intel Foundation Young Scientist Awards
 Scott Nicholas Sanders (Coral Springs, FL)
 Logan Joseph Kleinwaks (Reston, VA)
 Karen Mendelson (Worcester, MA)

ISEF 1998 (Fort Worth, Texas) 
 Intel Foundation Young Scientist Awards
 James Warner Lawler (Greenwich, CT)
 Jonathan Adam Kelner (Old Westbury, NY)
 Geoffrey Robert Schmidt (Little Rock, AR)
 Pinnacle Awards
 Chad Ganske, Amit Barman and Jonathan Haines (Winchester, VA)
 Heather Matthews and Twila Paterson (Colorado Springs, CO)

ISEF 1999 (Philadelphia, Pennsylvania) 
 Intel Foundation Young Scientist Awards
 Jennifer Lynn Pelka (Orlando, FL)
 Nisha Nagarkatti (Blacksburg, VA)
 Feng Zhang (Des Moines, IA)

ISEF 2000 (Detroit, Michigan) 
 Intel Foundation Young Scientist Awards
 Nazanin Jouei (Coral Springs, FL)
 Karen Kay Powell (Fort Pierce, FL)
 Jason L. Douglas (Milford, OH)

ISEF 2001 (San Jose, California) 
 Intel Foundation Young Scientist Awards
 Ryan Randall Patterson (Grand Junction, CO)
 Monika Paroder (Brooklyn, NY)
 Francis Boulva (Town of Mount-Royal, Canada)

ISEF 2002 (Louisville, Kentucky) 
 Intel Foundation Young Scientist Awards
 Naveen Neil Sinha (Los Alamos, NM)
 Alexander C. Mittal (Cos Cob, CT)
 Nina Vasan (Vienna, WV)

ISEF 2003 (Cleveland, Ohio) 
Intel Foundation Young Scientist Awards
 Lisa Doreen Glukhovsky (New Milford, CT)
 Elena Leah Glassman (Pipersville, PA)
 Anila Madiraju (Brossard, Canada)

ISEF 2004 (Portland, Oregon) 
 Intel Foundation Young Scientist Awards
 Sarah Rose Langberg (Fort Myers, FL)
 Uwe Treske (Grafenhainichen, Germany)
 Yuanchen Zhu (Shanghai, China)

ISEF 2005 (Phoenix, Arizona) 
 Intel Foundation Young Scientist Awards
 Gabrielle Alyce Gianelli (Orlando, FL)
 Stephen Schulz (Gelsenkirchen, Germany)
 Ameen Abdulrasool (Chicago, IL)

ISEF 2006 (Indianapolis, Indiana) 
 Intel Foundation Young Scientist Awards
 Hannah Louise Wolf (Allentown, PA)
 Madhavi Pulakat Gavini (Starkville, MS)
 Meredith Ann MacGregor (Boulder, CO)

ISEF 2007 (Albuquerque, New Mexico) 
 Intel Foundation Young Scientist Awards
 Dayan Li (Greenbelt, MD)
 Philip Vidal Streich (Platteville, WI)
 Dmitry Vaintrob (Eugene, OR)

ISEF 2008 (Atlanta, Georgia) 
 Intel Foundation Young Scientist Awards
 Sana Raoof (Muttontown, NY)
 Natalie Saranga Omattage (Cleveland, MS)
 Yi-Han Su (Taipei, Taiwan)

ISEF 2009 (Reno, Nevada) 
 Intel Foundation Young Scientist Awards
 Tara Adiseshan (Charlottesville, VA)
 Li Boynton (Houston, TX)
 Olivia Schwob (Boston, MA)

ISEF 2010 (San Jose, California)
 Gordon E. Moore Award: Amy Chyao (Richardson, TX)
 Young Scientist Award: Kevin Ellis (Vancouver, WA)
 Young Scientist Award: Yale Fan (Beaverton, OR)

ISEF 2011 (Los Angeles, California)
 Gordon E. Moore Award: Matthew Feddersen and Blake Marggraff (Lafayette, CA) 
 Young Scientist Award: Pornwasu Pongtheerawan, Arada Sungkanit and Tanpitcha Phongchaipaiboon (Suratthani, Thailand)
 Young Scientist Award: Taylor Wilson (Reno, NV)

ISEF 2012 (Pittsburgh, Pennsylvania)
 Gordon E. Moore Award: Jack Thomas Andraka (Glen Burnie, MD)
 Young Scientist Award: Nicholas Benjamin Schiefer (Ontario, Canada)
 Young Scientist Award: Ari Misha Dyckovsky (Sterling, VA)

ISEF 2013 (Phoenix, Arizona)
 Gordon E. Moore Award: Ionut Budisteanu (Ramnicu Valcea, Romania)
 Young Scientist Award: Eesha Khare (Saratoga, CA)
 Young Scientist Award: Henry Lin (Shreveport, LA)

ISEF 2014 (Los Angeles, California)
 Gordon E. Moore Award: Nathan Han (Boston, MA)
 Young Scientist Award: Lennart Kleinwort (Wurzburg, Germany)
 Young Scientist Award: Shannon Winjing Lee (Singapore)

ISEF 2015 (Pittsburgh, Pennsylvania)
 Gordon E. Moore Award: Raymond Wang (Vancouver, Canada)
 Young Scientist Award: Nicole Ticea (Vancouver, Canada)
 Young Scientist Award: Karan Jerath (Friendswood, TX)

ISEF 2016 (Phoenix, Arizona)
 Gordon E. Moore Award: Han Jie (Austin) Wang (Vancouver, Canada)
 Young Scientist Award: Syamantak Payra (Friendswood, TX)
 Young Scientist Award: Kathy Liu (Salt Lake City, UT)

ISEF 2017 (Los Angeles, California)
 Gordon E. Moore Award: Ivo Zell (Hessen, Germany)
 Young Scientist Award: Valerio Pagliarino (Castelnuovo Calcea, Italy)
 Young Scientist Award: Amber Yang (Windermere, FL)

ISEF 2018 (Pittsburgh, Pennsylvania)
 Gordon E. Moore Award: Oliver Nicholls (Sydney, Australia)
 Young Scientist Award: Meghana Bollimpalli (Little Rock, AR)
 Young Scientist Award: Dhruvik Parikh (Bothell, WA)

ISEF 2019 (Phoenix, Arizona)
 Gordon E. Moore Award: Krithik Ramesh (Greenwood Village, CO)
 Young Scientist Award: Allison Sihan Jia (San Jose, CA)
 Young Scientist Award: Rachel Seevers (Lexington, KY)
 Craig R. Barrett Award for Innovation : Shriya Reddy (Northville, MI)

ISEF 2020 (Anaheim, California)
 Cancelled due to the COVID-19 pandemic and replaced with a virtual fair. Because some qualifier events did not name winners, the fair was not judged and prizes were not awarded.

ISEF 2021 (VIRTUAL) 
 George D. Yancopoulos Innovator Award: Michelle Hua (Troy, MN)
 Young Scientist Award: Catherine Kim (Jericho, NY)
 Young Scientist Award: Daniel Shen (Cary, NC)
 Gordon E. Moore Award for Positive Outcomes for Future Generations: John Benedict Estrada (Fresno, CA)
 Craig R. Barrett Award for Innovation: Arya Tschand (Marlboro, NJ)
 H. Robert Horvitz Prize for Fundamental Research: Neha Mani (Bronx, NY)
 Peggy Scripps Award for Science Communication: Franklin Wang (Palo Alto, CA)

ISEF 2022 (Atlanta, Georgia) 
 George D. Yancopoulos Innovator Award: Robert Sansone (Fort Pierce, FL) 
 Young Scientist Award: Rishab Jain (Portland, OR)
 Young Scientist Award: Abdullah Al-Ghamdi (Dammam, Saudi Arabia)
 Gordon E. Moore Award for Positive Outcomes for Future Generations: Chris Tidtijumreonpon, Napassorn Litchiowong & Wattanapong Uttayota (Chiang Mai, Thailand)
 Craig R. Barrett Award for Innovation: Amon Schumann (Berlin, Germany)
 H. Robert Horvitz Prize for Fundamental Research: Rebecca Cho (Jericho, NY)
 Peggy Scripps Award for Science Communication: Anika Puri (Chappaqua, NY)

See also 
The Society for Science also administers two other international science competitions:
The Regeneron Science Talent Search, previously sponsored by Westinghouse and Intel.
The Broadcom MASTERS for middle school students.

References

External links 

 

Annual fairs
Science competitions
Youth science
Society for Science & the Public
Science and Engineering Fair
Fairs in the United States